Sido, also known as Salseom, is an island off the coast of Incheon, South Korea. Yeondo-gyo, a bridge connecting Sido and Sindo, was completed in 1992.

Sido and Sindo are both part of Bukdo-myeon, Ongjin County, Incheon Metropolitan City.

See also
Islands of South Korea
Incheon

References 
  Naver 백과사전: 시도

Islands of Incheon